Saint Odo of Urgell (c. 1065 – 1122) was a bishop of Urgell, noted for his care for the poor. He was from the family of the counts of Pallars Sobirà. He is buried in the monastery of Santa Maria de Gerri. In 1133 his successor declared him to be a saint, and he is venerated as such today.  Odo is one of the patron saints of the town of La Seu d'Urgell.  His feast day is July 7.

References

External links
 Catholic.org - Saint Odo of Urgell

1060s births
1122 deaths
Catalan Roman Catholic saints
Bishops of Urgell
Medieval Spanish saints
People from the Province of Lleida
11th-century Roman Catholic bishops in Spain
12th-century Roman Catholic bishops in Spain